Frances Gabe (born Frances Grace Arnholtz, June 23, 1915 – December 26, 2016) was a feminist artist and inventor and  most well known for designing and building the first "self-cleaning house" in Newberg, Oregon. Disgusted with the nuisance of cleaning as a housewife in the 1970s Gabe invented a house that purported to clean itself. She received a patent for her invention in 1984 which included 68 separate inventions for sprinklers and drying units that would wash and dry everything from the walls, the clothes, the dishes, etc. and channeled the waste water out of the house via a series of drains in the floor. Gabe and her invention were featured in People magazine in 1982 and in The New York Times’ Home & Garden section in 2002, as well as on Phil Donahue's talk show and in several books, including Chuck Palahniuk's Fugitives & Refugees (2003). The model for the house was displayed in 2002 - 2003 at The Women's Museum in Dallas, Texas where it was a popular exhibit. It is now part of the Hagley Museum and Library's collection.

Early life 
Gabe was born in 1915 on a ranch near Boise, Idaho. Her mother Erenstine, died when Gabe was very young and she did not get along with her step-mother. Gabe spent most of her childhood with her father Frederick, as he worked as a building contractor and architect on construction sites. Gabe attended eighteen different elementary schools as her family travelled around the Pacific Northwest for work. In 1929, she graduated from the Girl's Polytechnic School in Portland, Oregon at the age of sixteen having completed six years of middle school and high school in two years. She had a difficult time in school and told Chuck Palahnuik, when interviewed for his book about unique characters in Portland Oregon, "I was born a most unusual person, so I had a heck of a time in school. Everything moved much too slowly," Gabe continued. "My last day, I stood up in class and screamed at my teacher, "You told us that last week!"

Personal life 
Gabe married Herbert Bateson, an electrical engineer in 1932 and they had two children. They ran a construction and maintenance company together for many years. The couple eventually divorced in the 1970s. After the divorce Gabe changed her last name which was a combination of her maiden and married names: Grace, Arnholtz, Bateson and E.

Inventions 

Gabe's invention was borne out of frustration. "Why waste time loading a dishwasher, then unloading it and putting them in the cupboard? Why can't dishes be washed in the cupboard and save time?" Gabe wanted to do away with the thankless job of housecleaning. With her own money and construction skills, Gabe built a house on her property in Newberg which was full of devices that washed and dried the interior of the house. This led to her applying in 1980 and finally receiving patent number 4,428,085 on January 31, 1984, for Self-Cleaning Building Construction. Her patent application stated "A self-cleaning building construction comprises apparatus for applying a fine spray or mist of water and/or water and detergent to wall, floor and ceiling surfaces, followed by warm air drying. Floors slope in a direction for removing excess moisture via a drain. Also included are closet apparatus for cleaning clothing, cupboard dishwasher apparatus for cleaning stored dishes, self-cleaning bathtub apparatus, and self-cleaning washbasin apparatus."

Gabe built a two-story model of the patented house and toured the country doing interviews and lectures in the hopes of inspiring interest and selling her patent rights. Unfortunately she was never able to find a buyer and her home remained the only one of its kind. Over the years she offered tours of her home to visitors for a modest fee but it was not enough to maintain her patent or the upkeep of her house.

Death and legacy 
Gabe outlived her husband and her children. She died at the age of 101 at the end of 2016 in a nursing home in obscurity. It was not until July 2017 that the New York Times ran an obituary about Gabe that sparked people's interest in her again. Other publications picked up on this and ran their own articles on her including the Smithsonian Magazine and  MIT. Gabe's house was sold when her family had to put her in a nursing home. The house still stands but most of the self-cleaning features have been removed by the current owner.

Artist Lily Benson visited Gabe at her home in 2005 and that visit inspired a short film by Benson based on Gabe's invention which was released in 2015.

Collections 

 Self-Cleaning House Model, January 31, 1984, Hagley Museum and Library

Further reading 

 Palahniuk, Chuck, Fugitives and Refugees: A Walk in Portland, Oregon, Vintage Books, 2003

References

1915 births
2016 deaths
American centenarians
20th-century American inventors
Artists from Oregon
People from Newberg, Oregon
Women inventors
Women centenarians